The 1876 United States presidential election in Vermont took place on November 7, 1876, as part of the 1876 United States presidential election. Voters chose five representatives, or electors to the Electoral College, who voted for president and vice president.

Vermont voted for the Republican nominee, Rutherford B. Hayes, over the Democratic nominee, Samuel J. Tilden. Hayes won Vermont by a margin of 36.92%.

With 68.30% of the popular vote, Vermont would be Hayes' strongest victory in terms of percentage in the popular vote.

Results

See also
 United States presidential elections in Vermont

References

Vermont
1876
1876 Vermont elections